Burk Brothers and Company, also known as Diskmakers, was a historic factory complex located in the Northern Liberties neighborhood of Philadelphia, Pennsylvania. The complex consisted of 12 interconnected brick and reinforced concrete buildings, built between 1855 and 1913.  The buildings were designed for the processing of kidskins into morocco or glazed kid leather.

It was added to the National Register of Historic Places in 1985.  They have since been demolished.

References

Industrial buildings and structures on the National Register of Historic Places in Philadelphia
Northern Liberties, Philadelphia
Defunct leather manufacturers